Combined Scottish Universities by-election may refer to one six parliamentary by-elections held for the three-seat British House of Commons constituency called the "Combined Scottish Universities":

 1927 Combined Scottish Universities by-election
 1934 Combined Scottish Universities by-election
 1935 Combined Scottish Universities by-election
 1936 Combined Scottish Universities by-election
 1938 Combined Scottish Universities by-election
 1945 Combined Scottish Universities by-election
 1946 Combined Scottish Universities by-election

See also

 Combined Scottish Universities (UK Parliament constituency)